The Canon EOS 800D, known in the Americas as the EOS Rebel T7i and in Japan as the EOS Kiss X9i, is a digital single-lens reflex camera announced by Canon on February 14, 2017. It is the successor to the EOS 750D (Rebel T6i) and the predecessor to the EOS 850D (Rebel T8i).

The camera is aimed at amateur photographers.

Main features
Compared to the EOS 750D/Rebel T6i, several modifications were made, including:
 New 24.2-megapixel CMOS sensor with Dual Pixel CMOS AF, instead of Hybrid CMOS AF III.
 45 cross-type AF points, compared to 19.
 DIGIC 7, standard ISO 100–25600, H:51200 (DIGIC 6, ISO 100–12800, H:25600 on the 760D)
 High-speed Continuous Shooting at up to 6.0 fps
 Built-in Bluetooth.
 1080p at 60/50 fps video recording capability
 Movie Electronic IS
 Built-in HDR and time-lapse recording capability (new software)
 15 Custom Functions with 44 settings settable with the camera
 By default, the 800D uses Canon's standard UI, but if desired, it can be switched to the more beginner-friendly graphic UI also found in the new 77D.
 Compatible with Bluetooth remote BR-E1

Predecessor comparison
The Canon EOS Rebel T7i/800D is the successor to the Canon EOS Rebel T6i/750D with the following improvements.
 Better maximum video frame rate: 1080p/60fps vs 1080p/30fps.
More AF Points: 45 vs 19 points.
 Longer battery life: 600 vs 440 Shots.
 Faster continuous shooting (burst mode): 6.0 FPS vs 4.8 FPS.
 Bigger RAW Buffer: 24 vs 6 Shots.
 Higher extended ISO: 51200 vs 25600 ISO.
 Lighter weight: 532g vs 555g (23g lighter).

References

External links

Cameras introduced in 2017
Live-preview digital cameras
Canon EOS DSLR cameras